Aleksander Zawisza (12 December 1896 – 28 March 1977) was the prime minister of the Polish Government in Exile from 25 June 1965 to 16 July 1970.

Previously the minister of foreign affairs, in 1959 he played a part in moving the wartime archives of the Ministry of Information and Documentation from the UK to the Hoover Institution at Stanford University.

References

1896 births
1977 deaths
Polish diplomats
Prime Ministers of Poland
Polish emigrants to the United Kingdom